The Fencing competition in the 1981 Summer Universiade were held in Bucharest, Romania.

Medal overview

Men's events

Women's events

Medal table

References
 Universiade fencing medalists on HickokSports

1981 Summer Universiade
Universiade
Fencing at the Summer Universiade
Fencing competitions in Romania